Elia is a village in the Kyrenia District of Cyprus, located southeast of Karavas. It is under the de facto control of Northern Cyprus.

References

Communities in Kyrenia District
Populated places in Girne District